Katie Linendoll is an American television personality, speaker, journalist, consumer technology expert, and one of the leading women in the field of technology.

As one of the most in-demand technology experts worldwide, Linendoll is recognized by a wide-range of audiences for her reporting and frequent appearances as an expert contributor for major media outlets including NBC’s Today show, The Rachael Ray Show, Hallmark’s Home & Family, and numerous other shows on The Weather Channel, CBS Sports Radio, and SiriusXM.

Previously, Linendoll contributed regularly to the CBS Early Show, and The Nate Berkus Show, Popular Science, ESPN, ESPN.com and ESPN The Magazine. She was the co-host of the A&E reality series We Mean Business and a regular for two years on HSN where she focused on the electronics and technology-related market. Linendoll also hosted the show All Access Weekly on Spike TV, featuring tech, gaming and comics.

Early life and education
Originally from Erie, Pennsylvania, Linendoll has been tech-minded since starting her career at the age of 12 when she began coding and earned her networking certificates before graduating from high school at the age of 18.  Linendoll went on to receive a B.S. in Information Technology New Media from the Rochester Institute of Technology.

Career

While still in college, Linendoll began her on-air career as the host of SportsZone on ESPN2. She later became an Associate Producer at ESPN's SportsCenter and earned an Emmy for her work. Later, she went back in front of the camera and became the resident technology expert at the HSN network where she was responsible for generating more than $20 million in sales.

She can be seen regularly on The Rachael Ray Show, CBS Sports Radio “D.A. Show”, the Weather Channel’s “AMHQ”, Chef Irvine Magazine, and the Today show and more, discussing consumer technology. Throughout her career, Linendoll has discussed the latest technology on The Nate Berkus Show, The Early Show, the Today show, Fitness Magazine, Runner’s World, SportsIllustrated.com, CBSNews.com's Health Pop, Popular Science, NBC News, Yahoo! Finance, and People Stylewatch magazine and has done thousands of TV and radio interviews across the US and Canada.

Speaking and Emcee 
Linendoll is widely known for her keynote speaking and emcee work.

She has participated in media projects with Dell, Veeam, HP, Hyatt, IBM, Outdoor Association, Deloitte, Lenovo, SAS, Global Semiconductor Alliance, Society of Manufacturing Engineers, Comcast, Mercedes-Benz, BMW, Cadillac and Lincoln.

Music 
Linendoll takes pride in living a faith-filled life as a devout Catholic and in 2021, she released her passion project—her self-funded Christian EP, Jericho Battle Cry.

She pledged 50% of all her merchandise and music sales to select small non-profits and later decided to change the pledge to 100%.

Katie’s debut single, “Jericho Battle Cry” supports Bugles Across America—a non-profit organization that has created a network of musician volunteers who provide Buglers to sound  “Taps” live at Veterans’ funerals at no cost.

Awards 
In  2005, Katie won an Emmy Award for her work on ESPN’s SportsCenter.

In 2008, Katie was nominated for a Daytime Emmy for A&E’s We Mean Business.

In 2010, Linendoll became a Silicon Valley Visionary Award Recipient, which celebrates Silicon Valley leaders in technology, education, venture capital, and entrepreneurship.

Alongside her two Emmy nominations, and one win, Linendoll also holds a Guinness World Record for the “Most High Fives in One Minute”.

Personal life 
Linendoll calls Boston home. She leads an active, faith-filled lifestyle as a runner, a fitness enthusiast, musician, and avid traveler. Her fitness has been spotlighted in Runner’s World and CBS Sports Radio. Linendoll trains in Krav Maga and is often spotlighted for her extensive pull-up regimen.

She also devotes a large percentage of her time to select philanthropic causes in healthcare and technology. She is an active supporter and donator to The Batcole Foundation, AYA Young Adult Cancer Survivorship Fund, Bugles Across America and Brooke’s Blossoming Hope and other select local parishes.

References

External links
 
 Linendoll's blog: Talk Nerdy to Me

Rochester Institute of Technology alumni
Living people
Year of birth missing (living people)
Place of birth missing (living people)
People from Erie, Pennsylvania
American television personalities
American women television personalities